Édouard Courtial (born 28 June 1973 in Neuilly-sur-Seine) is a French politician of The Republicans who currently serves as a member of the French Senate, representing the Oise department.

Political positions
Courtial cosigned a bill that would allow the French Internal Revenue Services to remove French Citizenship from French citizens who live outside of the French territories and don't establish their primary fiscal residence in France. After being nominated as Under-secretary for French expatriates affairs, he removed his name from the bill and explained his reasons in an interview for lepetitjournal.com and during the Assembly of the Representatives of the French living abroad.

In the UMP's 2012 leadership election, Courtial endorsed Jean-François Copé.

In the Republicans’ 2016 presidential primaries, Courtial endorsed Nicolas Sarkozy as the party's candidate for the office of President of France. In the Republicans’ 2017 leadership election, he endorsed Laurent Wauquiez.

References

1973 births
Living people
People from Neuilly-sur-Seine
Politicians from Île-de-France
Union for French Democracy politicians
The Republicans (France) politicians
The Strong Right
Deputies of the 12th National Assembly of the French Fifth Republic
Deputies of the 13th National Assembly of the French Fifth Republic
Deputies of the 14th National Assembly of the French Fifth Republic
French Senators of the Fifth Republic
Senators of Oise
Saint-Jean de Passy alumni
Paris Dauphine University alumni
ESSEC Business School alumni